Victoria Jackson is an American entrepreneur and writer who ran the cosmetics business Victoria Jackson Cosmetics for many years. In 2008, after her daughter was diagnosed with neuromyelitis optica (NMO), Jackson and her husband established the Guthy-Jackson Charitable Foundation, funding research into NMO treatment and cures.  In 2017, she was inducted into the National Women's Hall of Fame in Seneca Falls, New York.

Her son is singer and songwriter Jackson Guthy.

Publications

References

External links
 Official Website
 The Guthy-Jackson Charitable Foundation

Year of birth missing (living people)
Living people
American cosmetics businesspeople
American philanthropists
Place of birth missing (living people)
20th-century American businesswomen
20th-century American businesspeople
21st-century American businesswomen
21st-century American businesspeople